The 2007–08 Biathlon World Cup statistics gives a detailed tabular account of the accumulating Biathlon World Cup scores and related rankings of the top 30 biathletes in the Total (Overall) World Cup, and the top 15 in each of the Individual, Sprint, Pursuit, and Mass start Cups, as well as the top 10 nations in the Relay Cup and top 15 in the Nation Cup, for the duration of the 2007-08 World Cup season, including the 2008 Biathlon World Championships, which counted as usual in the World Cup scores.

For top 10 result listings and short summaries of all the season's World Cup races, please see the parent article.

Men's Overall Results

Total

23 of 26 races count towards the overall total.

Individual

Sprint

Pursuit

Mass Start

Relay

Nations

Only sprint, individual and relay events count towards the Nations Cup.

The top three of five relays and the top 11 of 13 individual or sprint races count towards the final standings.

Women's Overall Results

Total

23 of 26 races count towards the overall total.

Individual

Sprint

Pursuit

Mass Start

Relay

Nations

Only sprint, individual and relay events count towards the Nations Cup. Thus the numbers along the top row in this table do not correspond to the numbers on the total standings.

The top three of five relays and the top 11 of 13 individual or sprint races count towards the final standings.

References
 IBU site

Statistics